Lorenzo Colombini (born 17 January 2001) is an Italian professional footballer who plays as a defender for  club Renate, on loan from Spezia.

Club career
He was raised in the youth teams of Inter and represented the club in the 2018–19 UEFA Youth League and 2019–20 UEFA Youth League.

In the summer of 2020, he joined Spezia. On 22 September 2020, he was loaned to Serie C club Novara.

He made his professional Serie C debut for Novara on 13 December 2020 in a game against Pergolettese. He made his first start on 7 March 2021 against Lecco.

On 26 August 2021, he was loaned to Serie C club Giana Erminio.

On 1 August 2022, Colombini moved on loan to Renate.

International career
He was first called up to represent his country in 2016 for the Under-15 squad friendlies. In 2019, he played in the UEFA Under-19 qualifiers, the final tournament was eventually cancelled due to the COVID-19 pandemic in Europe.

References

External links
 

2001 births
Living people
Footballers from Milan
Italian footballers
Association football defenders
Serie C players
Spezia Calcio players
Novara F.C. players
A.S. Giana Erminio players
A.C. Renate players
Italy youth international footballers